Talala is one of the 182 Legislative Assembly constituencies of Gujarat state in India. It is part of Gir Somnath district.

List of segments
This assembly seat represents the following segments,

 Mandorana
 Talala Taluka
 Sutrapada Taluka
 Mendarda Taluka (Part) Village – Lakadveri nes.

Members of Legislative Assembly
1990 - Jethabhai Ranabhai Jora, Indian National Congress
2007 - Bhagvanbhai Barad, Indian National Congress
2012 - Jasubhai Barad, Indian National Congress
2016 (by poll) - Govindbhai Parmar, Bharatiya Janta Party

Election results

2022

2017

2016

2012

See also
 List of constituencies of Gujarat Legislative Assembly
 Gujarat Legislative Assembly

References

External links
 

Assembly constituencies of Gujarat
Gir Somnath district